Allantoporthe is a genus of fungi within the Diaporthaceae family.

External links

Diaporthaceae